Eckington and Renishaw railway station is a former railway station between Eckington and Renishaw in Derbyshire, England.

See also
Three stations have at some time included "Eckington" in their names:

Eckington and Renishaw which is the subject of this article.

History
The station was opened by the North Midland Railway on their "Old Road" between Chesterfield and Rotherham Masborough.

The original station was of an ornate Italianate design by Francis Thompson and was replaced by a new one fourteen chains further north in 1874.

It was renamed by the Midland Railway as Eckington and Renishaw in 1886 since it was near to the Renishaw Iron Company's works and there was another "Eckington" station on the Birmingham and Gloucester Railway which the Midland had acquired.

The Manchester, Sheffield and Lincolnshire Railway (later the Great Central Railway) subsequently opened a station on 1 June 1892 within sight of the Midland's "Eckington and Renishaw" and called their station "Eckington and Renishaw". The ex-Great Central station was renamed Renishaw Central by British Railways on 25 September 1950.

The street level booking office was built on a bridge over the line with covered stairways leading down to the two platforms.

The station closed completely in 1951. The line is now part of the current Midland Main Line.

Passenger services
In 1922 passenger services calling at Eckington and Renishaw were at their most intensive, with trains serving three destinations via three overlapping routes:

 On Sundays only 
 On Mondays to Saturdays three stopping services plied between Sheffield (MR) and Chesterfield
 most ran direct down the "New Road" through  and went nowhere near Eckington and Renishaw.
 the other two services went the "long way round" via the "Old Road". They set off north eastwards from Sheffield (MR) towards Rotherham then swung east to go south along the Old Road
 one of these continued past , a short distance before Masboro' then swung hard right, next stop Treeton, then all stations, including Eckington and Renishaw, to Chesterfield, 
 the other continued past  then swung right onto the Sheffield District Railway passing through or calling at West Tinsley and Catcliffe before Treeton, after which they called at all stations to Chesterfield.

References

Notes

Sources

External links
Eckington and Renishaw station: old maps via Old-Maps

Former Midland Railway stations
Railway stations in Great Britain opened in 1840
Railway stations in Great Britain closed in 1951
Disused railway stations in Derbyshire
Francis Thompson railway stations